Command & Conquer: Red Alert 3 – Uprising is a 2009 real-time strategy video game developed by EA Los Angeles and published by Electronic Arts. It is a stand-alone expansion to Command & Conquer: Red Alert 3 released for Microsoft Windows and offered via digital distribution. It features about 30 new maps for traditional skirmish with many of these taking place in new environments. It does not contain any multiplayer elements such as cooperative play, online play or network play.

A part of Uprising called Commander's Challenge was also released as Command & Conquer: Red Alert 3 – Commander's Challenge for the PlayStation 3 and Xbox 360 on September 24, 2009. It functions as a stand-alone game and does not require Red Alert 3 to play. Commander's Challenge contains only the Commander's Challenge mode of Uprising and the new units and weapons, but not the campaign or skirmish modes.

Campaigns
Uprising picks up on where the Allied Campaign of the original game left off. Four "mini-campaigns" are available, one for each faction in Red Alert 3 and a bonus one centered around the origins of the Empire's commando Yuriko Omega. Each of the campaigns is three missions long, with the exception of the Soviet one, which consists of four. Initially only the Soviet and Yuriko campaigns are available, the campaigns for the Allies and the Empire of the Rising Sun becoming available after finishing the first mission in the Soviet campaign.

Plot
All three campaigns assume that the Allied faction was victorious at the end of Red Alert 3. Both the Soviet Union and Imperial Japan have surrendered.

The Soviet campaign focuses on the remaining Soviet resistance trying to stop FutureTech, an Allied defense contractor which plans to create a super weapon called the "Sigma Harmonizer", a device to selectively stop time. FutureTech is revealed to have been helped by European Union President Rupert Thornley. Thornley plans to remove the Soviet Union from the timeline.

The Allied campaign concentrates on defeating several Imperial commanders who still resist Allied occupation. Emperor Tatsu has seemingly begun to cooperate with the Allies, but reveals his true intentions after his military authority is restored by the fall of Takara, the last commander in the Allied campaign.

The Empire's campaign covers the fight against two Soviet generals whose attempts to conquer parts of Japan is ignored by the Allied governor. The Allied forces finally decide to intervene in the last mission by attacking both belligerents.

The Yuriko campaign recounts the story of Yuriko Omega, her origins and discovery by the Imperial military, her captivity by the Allies and her fight to rescue her sister. Unlike the other campaigns, this campaign resembles an action role-playing game instead of a real-time strategy. The camera is always locked on Yuriko and the sidebar, minimap and threat meter are replaced with a compact command bar dedicated to Yuriko and her abilities.

Commander's Challenge
Uprising also features a mode called Commander's Challenge in which players can play against AI commanders with various skill levels. This mode was also released as a stand-alone downloadable game for PlayStation 3 and Xbox 360.

Commander's Challenge contains 50 different, successively tougher scenarios. This is loosely based on Generals' Challenge from Command & Conquer: Generals – Zero Hour. It features some returning commanders from Red Alert 3 as well as some new ones. It contains some campaign-only units that appeared in the original Red Alert 3 such as the Tesla Tank and the Shogun Executioner. Certain maps in the Commander's Challenge also have special effects such as garbage raining from the sky or units produced on the map are shrunk. Before completing any missions, the player has access to only the basic units of each side, but upon completing each mission, more units are unlocked from the tech tree of that challenge's opponents.

Some missions have other standards, such as Blood Feud, in which Commanders Shinzo and Kenji will fight each other until the player attacks either. Also, in Commander's Challenge, the player can choose as which faction to play per mission, rather than playing the entire game as one faction. There are 13 main challenges and a further 37 side challenges which are unlocked when working through the game.

References

External links

2009 video games
Alternate history video games
Red Alert 3 - Uprising
Electronic Arts games
PlayStation Network games
Real-time strategy video games
Single-player video games
SAGE (game engine) games
Video game expansion packs
Video game sequels
Video games about time travel
Video games scored by Frank Klepacki
Video games scored by James Hannigan
Video games set in Antarctica
Video games set in Japan
Video games set in Mexico
Video games set in Romania
Video games set in Russia
Video games set in the Soviet Union
Video games set in the United States
Windows games
Xbox 360 Live Arcade games
Video games developed in the United States

sv:Command & Conquer: Red Alert 3#Uprising